Airport North station may refer to:

 Airport North station (Guangzhou Metro), a station on the Guangzhou Metro in Guangzhou, Guangdong.
 Airport North station (Shenzhen Metro), a station on the Shenzhen Metro in Shenzhen, Guangdong.